In My Dreams is the debut studio album by German recording artist Judith Lefeber. It was released by Warner Music on October 29, 2003.

Track listing

Charts

Release history

References

2003 debut albums
Judith Lefeber albums